Saint Fortunatus (died 537) was a 6th-century bishop of Todi.  According to tradition, he defended Todi during a Gothic siege. He is the patron saint of Todi.  He is praised by Gregory the Great, who calls him a man of great virtue who took great care in attending to the sick. Gregory, who was born around the time that Fortunatus died, was greatly interested in Fortunatus' life.  Gregory writes that "a certain poor old man was brought to me –because I always love to talk with such men- of whom I inquired his country, and hearing that he was of the city of Todi, I asked him whether he knew Bishop Fortunatus.  He said he knew him very well.  'Then I beseech you,' said I, 'tell me whether you know of any miracles that he did, and, since I am very desirous to know, explained to me what manner of man he was.'"

Veneration
The church of San Fortunato in Todi is dedicated to him and holds his relics.  San Fortunato began as a Palaeo-Christian temple (7th century) and in 1292 the construction of a new Gothic edifice was begun by the Franciscans, with a "hall" structure. The crypt houses a sepulchre containing the remains of Fortunatus and other saints, as well as the tomb of Jacopone da Todi.

References 

Bishops in Umbria
6th-century Italian bishops
6th-century Christian saints
537 deaths
Medieval Italian saints
Year of birth unknown